40 qm Deutschland is a 1986 West German film directed by Tevfik Başer, who helped both with the script and the production. The film won several awards making it one of the most significant German movies of 1986.

Production
40 qm Deutschland was first released on 31 July 1986.
The shooting of the movie took 21 days, but the following editing seven weeks. With only 450,000 DM (c. US$280,000) spent on its output, it was a low-budget production. The only setting is a 40 m2 apartment in an old building in Hamburg.
Başer, who was chasing a vision he had been fostering for some time, procured the production, the script, the direction, the crew and the location almost all by himself. The church musician Claus Banzer ended up being in charge of the music, Izzet Akay was trusted with the camera and the lead actress Özay Fecht was already known as a jazz singer.
Six months prior to the premiere, Baser explained his reasons for the project to the Frankfurter Rundschau:

I want to try to show and clarify some of the thoughts and feelings of people who belong to a foreign culture, about which I criticize some parts but which I also understand because of its tradition. I want the Germans to get to know us, because the unknown is scary and produces hate, as you can see based on the demonstrations against the Turks. Because of that I show the circumstances of the foreign workers in Germany based on this example without even leaving the apartment.

References

External links
 

1985 films
West German films
Films set in Hamburg
Immigration to Germany
1980s German-language films
1980s Turkish-language films
Films directed by Tevfik Başer
1980s German films

German multilingual films